= Adu Kili =

- Location within Pakistan
- Coordinates: 33.68°N 70.45°E
- Country: Pakistan
- Territory: Khyber Pakhtunkhwa
- Elevation: 1,636 m (5,367 ft)
- Time zone: UTC+5 (PST)
  - Summer (DST): UTC+6 (PDT)

Adu Kili is a town in the Khyber Pakhtunkhwa province of Pakistan. It is located at 33°40'42N 70°27'3E with an altitude of 1636 metres (5370 feet).
